Bad Alexandersbad is a municipality of Germany in Oberfranken (Bavaria), in the district of Wunsiedel. Population (2020): 977. The municipality consists of the villages Dünkelhammer, Kleinwendern, Sichersreuth and Tiefenbach.

References

Wunsiedel (district)
Spa towns in Germany